Biberstein - is a Polish coat of arms. It was used by several szlachta families in the times of the Kingdom of Poland and the Polish–Lithuanian Commonwealth.

History

Blazon

Notable bearers

Notable bearers of this coat of arms include:

Gallery

See also
 Bieberstein
 Polish heraldry
 Heraldic family
 List of Polish nobility coats of arms

Bibliography 
 Bobrowicz, Jan Nepomucen "Herbarz polski Kaspra Niesieckiego S.J. powiększony dodatkami z późniejszych autorów, rękopisów, dowodów urzędowych", Tom I, Lipsk 1839-1846
 Ulanowski B. Inscriptiones clenodiales ex libris iudicialibus palatinatus Cracoviensis, "Starodawne prawa polskiego pomniki", Kraków 1885
 Piekosiński Franciszek "Heraldyka polska wieków średnich"'', Kraków 1899
 Białkowski Leon "Ród Bibersteinów a ród Momotów godła jeleniego Rogu w wiekach XIV-XVI" Lublin 1948

External links
 http://gajl.wielcy.pl/herby_nazwiska.php?lang=pl&herb=biberstein

Polish coats of arms